Raymond Braun is an American media personality, journalist, and LGBTQ advocate.

Early life and education 
Braun grew up in Toledo, Ohio, a city in Northwest Ohio. The first time he saw a queer person on TV was Matthew Shepard. He graduated from Stanford University.

Career 
In 2013, Braun was an associate product marketing manager for YouTube Entertainment Marketing. He developed and implemented YouTube's first LGBTQ+ marketing campaign, #ProudToLove. The effort generated millions of views and widespread support. Afterwards, he became the LGBT marketing lead for Google and YouTube. In January 2015, Braun took a leave of absence from Google to start a YouTube channel focused on LGBT issues. , he is a contributing editor for Seventeen. Braun is the host of the 2019 documentary, State of Pride.

Awards and honors 
Braun is gay. In 2014, he was recognized on Forbes' 30 under 30 in marketing and advertising.

References

External links 
 

Living people
Year of birth missing (living people)
LGBT people from Ohio
Stanford University alumni
LGBT YouTubers
American LGBT rights activists
American LGBT journalists
American gay writers
21st-century American male writers
American YouTubers
Google employees
American marketing businesspeople
Internet marketing people
21st-century American LGBT people